St Mary's Church is in the town of Sandbach, Cheshire, England. The church is recorded in the National Heritage List for England as a designated Grade II* listed building. It is an active Anglican parish church in the diocese of Chester, the archdeaconry of Macclesfield and the deanery of Congleton.

History

The Domesday Book (c. 1086) records the presence of a priest and a church on the site of the present church, and it is shown on an 1840 map of the town centre of Sandbach. This was replaced by another church erected about the time of Henry VII. This church was built in sandstone which became badly weathered. The present church dates largely from the considerable degree of rebuilding by Sir George Gilbert Scott in 1847–49. Much of the existing fabric was replaced and the remaining fabric was encased in new stone. The builders were Cooper and Son of Derby. The stone, which came from quarries in the Mow Cop area, was given by Sir Philip Grey Egerton M.P. Part of the west end had to be repaired in 1894–95 following a fire. In 1930 Austin and Paley added a choir vestry, and a north porch, at a cost of £1,331. The parish registers date from 1562 and are complete. The churchwardens' accounts prior to 1888 are lost.

Architecture

Exterior
The plan of the church consists of a clerestoried nave and a choir of five bays, with aisles, side chapels, and a tower at the west end. The choir vestry projects from the northwest. The tower is unusual in that it stands on three open arches through which passes a public footpath. The style is mainly Perpendicular and some medieval masonry is still present in the arcades.

Interior

The font dates from 1859; it is made of Caen stone and was constructed by Thomas Stringer. It has a Greek Palindrome inscription, that reads "NIYON ANOMHMA MH MONAN OYINE". This translated means "Wash my sin not my countenance only". The old octagonal font dated 1669 and decorated with acanthus leaves, was returned to the church in 1938. Scott arranged the memorials around the walls of the aisles. One of these is a marble relief to the memory of Rev. John Armistead, who was vicar from 1828 to 1865. It was designed by G. F. Watts and sculpted by George Nelson in 1876. Another is to John Ford, who died in 1839, which includes a life-size allegorical female figure by an altar. The roofs are dated 1661. The roof over the north aisle includes a large coat of arms in a wreath. In the chapels and chancels is stained glass by William Wailes, and in the north aisle is a window by Kempe.

Bells
There is a ring of eight bells. Four of the bells were cast by Abraham II Rudhall in 1719, and a bell dated 1782 is attributed to Thomas Rudhall. Three later bells by John Warner and Sons are dated 1857, 1858 and 1868.

External features

The churchyard walls, gateways and railings to south-east and north of the church are listed at Grade II. The churchyard contains the war graves of fourteen service personnel, eleven of World War I and three of World War II.

Rectors, vicars and curates

Rectors c.1100–1256
before 1128: Steinulf the Priest
before 1153: Roger de Lech
c.1230: Thomas

Vicars c.1300–1887

Before 1327: Richard Burgillion (d.1327)
7 April 1327: Philip de Goodrich Castle (de Castro Godrici)
15 January 1344: William de Mere
23 June 1348: Thomas Chaumpain
7 September 1349: William de Upton (alias Welton)
15 October 1349: John de Tydrynton
7 March 1371: Randle del Ford
18 October 1401: Thomas de Hassall
21 September 1418: Thomas Hassall
7 May 1455: James Whiteacres
September 1465: Randle Penketh
7 March 1481: Roger Clifton
c.1517: Hugh Brereton
15 September 1535: Thomas Smyth
27 September 1548: Richard Smyth
19 May 1554: Peter Prestland
1565: Richard Smyth
23 May 1576: John Shaw
1616: Laurence Wood
16 November 1630: Thomas Tudman
1644: Joseph Cope (1622–1704)
c.1662: Thomas Tudman
15 May 1674: William Hayes
19 Mar 1695[6]: Thomas Welles, M.A.
13 May 1729: Hugh Mee, M.A.
13 April 1733: Samuel Allon, B.A.
25 September 1736: Blayney Baldwyn, M.A.
13 May 1739: Henry Baldwyn, M.A.
21 April 1773: Peter Haddon, M.A.
13 January 1787: Richard Lowndes Salmon, M.A.
20 February 1828: John Armitstead, M.A.
20 October 1865: John Richard Armitstead, M.A.
1919: John Hornby Armitstead, M.A.
1941: Reginald Norton Betts, M.A.
1964: Geoffrey Thomas Wykes, B.A.
1972: John Basil Rigby (d.2001)
9 September 1983: David W.G. Stocker, B.A.
2001: Rex Buckley
2008: Thomas Shepherd, B.A.
2020: Bee Boyde

Sources c.1100–1865. Sources: 1919–1983.

Curates
1548: Ricardus Rudiarte
1565: Johannes Shawe
13 January 1573: unknown
20 May 1701: Galfridus Williams
1708: Gulielmus Repton
21 June – 7 July 1725, Ranulphus Hazlehurst 
5 June 1733: Joseph Twemlowe
19 December 1737 – 13 July 1742: William Dickens 
10 June 1745 – 6 August 1754: George Penlington
1 June 1760: John Sibson

See also

Grade II* listed buildings in Cheshire East
Listed buildings in Sandbach

References

Sources

External links

Church website
Photographs of the exterior of the church by Colin Thornber

Church of England church buildings in Cheshire
Grade II* listed churches in Cheshire
Gothic Revival architecture in Cheshire
Churches in Sandbach
George Gilbert Scott buildings
Sandbach
Diocese of Chester
Austin and Paley buildings
English Gothic architecture in Cheshire